The 2018 Western Athletic Conference women's soccer tournament was the postseason women's soccer tournament for the Western Athletic Conference held from October 31 to November 4, 2018. The five match tournament took place at Clyde Field in Orem, Utah on the campus of Utah Valley University. The six-team single-elimination tournament consisted of three rounds based on seeding from regular season conference play. The defending champions were the Utah Valley Wolverines , but they failed to defend their title after losing 3–0 to the UMKC Kangaroos in the semifinals.  The tournament champions were the Seattle Redhawks, who defeated UMKC 1–0 in the final. This was the fourth WAC women's soccer tournament championship for the Seattle women's soccer program, all of which have come under head coach Julie Woodward.

Bracket

Source:

Schedule

First round

Semifinals

Final

Statistics

Goalscorers 
1 Goal
 Sadie Brockbank – Utah Valley
 Sara Callister – Utah Valley
 Ryland Childers  – Kansas City
 Sandra Hill – Grand Canyon
 Lexie Howard  – Kansas City
 Kelsey Mothershead – Kansas City
 Jessie Ray – Seattle
 Kelsey Vogel – Seattle

Own Goals
 Texas–Tio Grande Valley vs. Seattle

All-Tournament team

Source:

References 

Western Athletic Conference women's soccer seasons
tournament 2018
Western Athletic Conference Women's Soccer